Cho Kyung-hee was a South Korean politician.

She was appointed as Minister of the Second Ministry of Political Affairs in 1988, and was Secretary of State for Political Affairs in 1989-1990.

References

20th-century South Korean women politicians
20th-century South Korean politicians
Year of birth missing (living people)
Place of birth missing (living people)
Women government ministers of South Korea